Maks Kaśnikowski (born 6 July 2003) is a Polish tennis player.

Kaśnikowski has a career high ATP singles ranking of 355 achieved on 20 March 2023. He also has a career high ATP doubles ranking of 766 achieved on 17 October 2022.

Kaśnikowski represents Poland at the Davis Cup, where he has a W/L record of 1–1.

ATP Challenger and ITF Futures Finals

Singles: 6 (2 titles, 4 runner-ups)

Doubles: 2 (1 titles, 1 runner-ups)

References

External links

2003 births
Living people
Polish male tennis players
Sportspeople from Warsaw